John MacNie (1844 – 31 October 1909), also known by his pen name Ismar Thiusen under which he wrote the novel The Diothas
,  was an educator and science fiction writer. Born in Scotland in 1844, he came to America in 1867 where he first obtained a job teaching Greek and Latin at a preparatory school in Newberg, New York.

Biography
Originally from Stirling, MacNie was educated at the University of Glasgow; he received an honorary M.A. degree from Yale University in 1874. He was a professor at the University of North Dakota for two decades; he was hired as professor of English, French, and German in 1886, and retired as professor of French and Spanish languages and literature during 1906. The University of North Dakota's MacNie Hall was named after him. MacNie published A Treatise on the Theory and Solution of Algebraic Equations in 1876, and Elements of Geometry, Plain and Solid in 1895.

He died in Hennepin, Minnesota.

References

American science fiction writers
Scottish science fiction writers
People from Stirling
Alumni of the University of Glasgow
University of North Dakota faculty
Scottish expatriates in the United States
American male novelists
1844 births
1909 deaths
19th-century American novelists
19th-century American male writers